The 2017 WGC-HSBC Champions was a golf tournament played from 26–29 October 2017 at the Sheshan Golf Club in Shanghai, China. It was the ninth WGC-HSBC Champions tournament, and the fourth of four World Golf Championships events held in the 2017 calendar year.

Justin Rose won his first HSBC Champions and second World Golf Championship.

Field
The following is a list of players who qualified for the 2017 WGC-HSBC Champions. The criteria are towards the leaders in points lists rather than tournament winners.  Players who qualify from multiple categories will be listed in the first category in which they are eligible with the other qualifying categories in parentheses next to the player's name.

1. Winners of the four major championships and The Players Championship
Kim Si-woo (3), Brooks Koepka (3,4) 
Sergio García (3,4,5), Jordan Spieth (3,4), and Justin Thomas (3,4) did not play.

2. Winners of the previous four World Golf Championships
Dustin Johnson (3,4), Hideki Matsuyama (3,4)

3. Top 50 from the OWGR on 9 October
Daniel Berger (4), Rafa Cabrera-Bello (5), Paul Casey (4), Jason Day (4), Tony Finau (4), Ross Fisher (5), Matt Fitzpatrick (5), Tommy Fleetwood (5), Branden Grace, Bill Haas, Adam Hadwin (4), Brian Harman (4), Tyrrell Hatton (5), Russell Henley (4), Matt Kuchar (4), Marc Leishman (4), Phil Mickelson, Francesco Molinari (5), Alex Norén (5), Pat Perez (4), Thomas Pieters (5), Jon Rahm (4,5), Patrick Reed (4,5), Justin Rose (4,5), Xander Schauffele (4), Charl Schwartzel (5), Adam Scott, Henrik Stenson (5), Jhonattan Vegas (4), Bernd Wiesberger (5)
Kevin Chappell (4), Jason Dufner (4), Rickie Fowler (4), Charley Hoffman (4), Zach Johnson, Kevin Kisner (4), Rory McIlroy (5), Ryan Moore, Louis Oosthuizen, Webb Simpson (4), Brandt Snedeker, Brendan Steele, and Gary Woodland (4) did not play.

4. Top 30 from the final 2017 FedEx Cup points list (if there are less than five available players, players beyond 30th will be selected to increase the number to five)
Patrick Cantlay, Charles Howell III, Chez Reavie, Kyle Stanley, Hudson Swafford
Mackenzie Hughes did not play.

5. Top 30 from the Race to Dubai as of 16 October
Kiradech Aphibarnrat, Paul Dunne, Ryan Fox, Alexander Lévy, Li Haotong, Mike Lorenzo-Vera, Thorbjørn Olesen, Richie Ramsay, Jordan Smith, Matthew Southgate, Hideto Tanihara, Peter Uihlein, Fabrizio Zanotti
Lee Westwood did not play.

6. The leading four available players from the Asian Tour Order of Merit as of 16 October
Shiv Chawrasia, Gavin Green, Scott Hend, David Lipsky

7. The leading two available players from the Japan Golf Tour Order of Merit as of 16 October
Chan Kim, Shugo Imahira
Yuta Ikeda, Satoshi Kodaira, and Yūsaku Miyazato did not play.

8. The leading two available players from the final 2016 PGA Tour of Australasia Order of Merit
Matthew Griffin, Michael Hendry

9. The leading two available players from the final 2016 Sunshine Tour Order of Merit
Richard Sterne, Brandon Stone
Dean Burmester did not play.

10. Six players from China
Cao Yi, Dou Zecheng, Liang Wenchong, Liu Yanwei, Wu Ashun, Zhang Xinjun

11. Alternates, if needed to fill the field of 78 players
The next available player on the Orders of Merit of the Asian Tour, Japan Golf Tour, Sunshine Tour, and PGA Tour of Australasia, ranked in order of their position in the OWGR as of 9 October
Next available player, not otherwise exempt, from Race to Dubai as of 16 October, OWGR as of 9 October, FedEx Cup list:
Ryu Hyun-woo (Japan Golf Tour; Shingo Katayama did not play)
Haydn Porteous (Sunshine Tour; Darren Fichardt did not play)
Phachara Khongwatmai (Asian Tour)
Ashley Hall (PGA Tour of Australasia)
Graeme Storm (Race to Dubai)
Wesley Bryan (OWGR; Jimmy Walker did not play)
Lucas Glover (FedEx Cup; Billy Horschel did not play)
Daisuke Kataoka (Japan Golf Tour)
Andrew Dodt (PGA Tour of Australasia)
Poom Saksansin (Asian Tour)

Nationalities in the field

Past champions in the field

Note: the HSBC Champions became a WGC event in 2009; winners before this are not listed.

Round summaries

First round
Thursday, 26 October 2017

Brooks Koepka shot an 8-under-par 64 to take a one-stroke lead over Kiradech Aphibarnrat and Gavin Green.

Second round
Friday, 27 October 2017

Dustin Johnson shot a 9-under-par 63 to take a one-stroke lead over first-round leader Brooks Koepka.

Third round
Saturday, 28 October 2017

Dustin Johnson shot a 4-under-par 68 to open a 6-shot lead over Brooks Koepka who was hurt by a triple-bogey on the par-5 8th hole.

Final round
Sunday, 29 October 2017

Justin Rose overcame an eight-stroke deficit to win by two strokes over third-round leader Dustin Johnson, as well as Brooks Koepka and Henrik Stenson. Rose shot a 5-under-par 67, tied for the low round with Phil Mickelson, while Johnson shot a 5-over-par 77 in windy conditions.

Scorecard

Cumulative tournament scores, relative to par
Source:

References

External links
Official site
Coverage on Asian Tour's official site
Coverage on European Tour's official site
Coverage on PGA Tour's official site

WGC-HSBC Champions
WGC-HSBC Champions
WGC-HSBC Champions
WGC-HSBC Champions